Kim L. O'Neill is the developer of a monoclonal antibody that allows for the accurate, cheap and easy detection of cancer.

O'Neill has a B.Sc. degree from New University of Ulster and a Ph.D. from the University of Ulster.  He is a full professor of microbiology at Brigham Young University. In 1998 research by O'Neill suggested a link between caffeine and the formation of some cancers. O'Neill has served as associate director of BYU's cancer research center.

O'Neill is also a convert to the Church of Jesus Christ of Latter-day Saints, having joined the church in Ireland.

References

External links
Short listing of O'Neill's credentials
BYU bio
Patent list for O'Neill
Article by O'Neill on his discoveries potential

Alumni of Ulster University
Brigham Young University faculty
Converts to Mormonism
Irish Latter Day Saints
Irish biologists
Living people
Irish emigrants to the United States
Year of birth missing (living people)